The Racine Depot is a historic railroad station located at 1402 Liberty Street in Racine, Wisconsin. The station was built in 1901 for the Chicago & Northwestern Railway. Architects Frost & Granger designed the Georgian Revival station. The depot, located on the southbound platform, included a waiting room, restrooms, a baggage room, and a ticket office. The waiting room's decorations included oak benches, wood paneling, and a terrazzo floor. A tunnel connected the depot to the westbound platform.

The station served up to twenty-six trains each day at its peak, providing a means for Racine County's citizens to travel to and from other cities. The Twin Cities 400, an express train from Chicago to Minneapolis, began service to the station in 1935; at the time, it was the fastest train in North America. The depot also brought presidential campaign trains to Racine, and Theodore Roosevelt, Franklin D. Roosevelt, and Harry Truman all travelled through the station. In 1971, the station closed when Amtrak replaced private passenger rail service in the United States; Racine County is now served by Amtrak's Sturtevant station. There are plans to restore service to Racine station as part of a commuter line between Milwaukee and Kenosha.

The depot was added to the National Register of Historic Places in 1980.

References

Buildings and structures in Racine, Wisconsin
Railway stations on the National Register of Historic Places in Wisconsin
Georgian Revival architecture in Wisconsin
Railway stations in the United States opened in 1901
Former Chicago and North Western Railway stations
National Register of Historic Places in Racine County, Wisconsin
Railway stations closed in 1971
Former railway stations in Wisconsin